Iwonka Bogumila Szymanska (born 11 July 1943) is a Polish composer and pianist who developed a new musical form she called a “sonnet.”

Szymanska was born in Warsaw. She debuted as a pianist in 1951 and began composing in 1965, also performing on the radio. She studied piano at the State Music College in Gdansk and composition at the State Music College in Warsaw, graduating in 1972. Her teachers included K. Jastrzebska and Witold Rudzinski.

Szymanka’s compositions Two Essays (1971) and Trylogia (1973) received prizes. Her compositions include:

Chamber 

Dwoj Eseje (harp)

Dyptyk (brass band)

First String Quartet

Fourth String Quartet

Freski Kameraine (horn, clarinet, harp)

Second String Quartet (with flute)

Third String Quartet

Tryptyk (brass band)

Orchestra 

First Sonnet

Mahoniowy Koncert (violin and orchestra)

Mobil

Play of Colors

Second Play of Colors

Third Sonnet (two pianos and orchestra)

Trylogia

Wiosenny Koncert (piano and orchestra)

Piano 

Arabeski (two pianos)

Esej (piano and percussion)

Trzy Sonety

Voice 

Second Sonnet (two sopranos, choir and orchestra)

References 

Polish composers
Polish women composers
1943 births
String quartet composers
Living people
Musical form